J Lloyd Crowe Secondary School (commonly referred to as J.L. Crowe) is a public high school in Trail, British Columbia, and is part of School District 20 Kootenay-Columbia. A new facility was opened in 2009, followed by the demolition of the older school. In the years 2014-2015 the school's enrollment was 850 students. The school serves the local areas including Trail, Rossland, Fruitvale, Warfield, and Montrose.

History
JL Crowe was founded in 1951, after demand grew over the smaller, and aging Trail High School in Downtown Trail.  The shops were extensive as Cominco hosted the largest apprenticeship programme at Crowe in Western Canada. The school also held 1st year Arts and Science classes until 1966 when Selkirk Regional College opened.  It was originally a grades 10-12 plus 1st year Arts & Science, as there were 2 middle schools in the area. Modifications were made to the school during the mid 70s, and 80s, and a bigger library. After 58 years the school was demolished, and a new one was built.

Staff
Aaron Mckenzie (Principal), 
Christine Byrd (Vice Principal), 
Rob McKay (Vice Principal),

New school
In late 2007, construction of a new school began on the field adjacent to the original school. The new building was opened in September 2009, and demolition of the old building was completed a few weeks later. It came with state of the art technology, including document cameras in most classrooms, and 70 new iPads that were later added for learning use. The new school has a gym, cardio room, weight room, a full science lab, and five classrooms for shop classes, including woodworking, metalworking, and electronics.

Student life
Students have a wide variety of classes to choose from, including art classes to shop classes. Students can also enter in after school activities including, strength training, cross-training, volleyball, basketball, swimming, field hockey, hockey, track and field, rugby, cross country running, and most importantly, debate. (The best choice). As of the 2019/2020 school year there were 826 students attending the school.

Extracurricular activities
Activities are run by the schools Leadership team. They include assemblies and other fun activities. They also make videos and post them on YouTube, and can be found under CroweTelevion.

Notable alumni
Gerry Moro - Olympian 1964 & 1972 Track and Field;
Dianne Gerace - Olympian 1964 Track and Field;
Jason Bay - Major League Baseball Rookie of the year;
Lauren Bay Regula - Olympian 2004 & 2020 Fastball;
Ben McPeek - composer, arranger, conductor, pianist;
Kerrin Lee-Gartner - Olympian 1988, 1992, 1994. 1992 Gold Medalist Downhill skiing;

NHL Hockey Players - 
Cesare Maniago,
Seth Martin,
Adam Deadmarsh,
Dallas Drake,
Ray Ferraro,
Mike Matteucci,
Steve Tambellini,
Steve McCarthy,
Ed Cristofoli,
Garth Rizzuto,

See also
List of school districts in British Columbia
West Kootenay

References
J. Lloyd Crowe Secondary School

High schools in British Columbia
Trail, British Columbia
1952 establishments in British Columbia
Educational institutions established in 1952